Folketing elections were held in Denmark on 29 May 1906. The result was a victory for the Venstre Reform Party, which won 56 of the 114 seats. Voter turnout was 69.8%.

Results

References

Elections in Denmark
Denmark
Folketing
Denmark